Ishqeria is a 2018 Indian Hindi-language romantic drama film written and directed by Prerna Wadhawan. The film stars Richa Chadda and Neil Nitin Mukesh in the lead roles. The dialogues are written by Radhika Anand. Ishqeria was theatrical released on 21 September 2018 after a delay of three years. The film's motion poster were released on 2 August 2018, followed by the theatrical trailer on 29 August 2018.

Cast
 Richa Chadda as Kuhu
 Neil Nitin Mukesh as Raghav 
 Gurbani Judge
 Mrinalini Sharma as Radhika
Mridula Sathe

Production
Ishqeria was shot between 2012 and 2014 in Mussoorie and Allahabad where the unit had faced problems due to the rough weather and production constraints. The film was slated to release in 2015, however due to Prerna's marriage, it was delayed.

Soundtrack  

The songs are composed by Rashid Khan, Papon and Wasim-Emraan. The lyrics are written by Rashid Khan, Protiqe Majumder, Ajay K. Garg and Haider Najmi.

References

External links
 

Films shot in Mussoorie
2018 romantic drama films
2010s Hindi-language films
Indian romantic drama films
Films scored by Papon